Vítězná is a municipality in Trutnov District in the Hradec Králové Region of the Czech Republic. It has about 1,500 inhabitants.

Administrative parts
The municipality is made up of villages of Bukovina, Hájemství, Huntířov, Kocléřov, Komárov, Nové Záboří and Záboří.

References

Villages in Trutnov District